Columbia is an unincorporated community in Columbia Township, Fayette County, Indiana.

History
Columbia was laid out in 1832. It took its name from Columbia Township. A post office was established at Columbia in 1833, and remained in operation until it was discontinued in 1903.

Geography
There is only 3 roads in the entire Columbia area: South County Road, West Columbia Road and West Monroe Street. There are over 20 buildings in Columbia (the actual number is unknown due to Columbia being unincorporated, meaning it has no political border).

References

Unincorporated communities in Fayette County, Indiana
Unincorporated communities in Indiana